Mark Alexander Fabian Nulty (born 9 October 1967 in Dublin) is a former Irish First-class cricket player who competed in the late 1980s. He played for 1 year on the Ireland cricket team.

References

External links

Living people
1967 births
Irish cricketers
Cricketers from Dublin (city)
20th-century Irish people